Cruizer class may refer to:

 , a mid 18th century brig-sloop class of the Royal Navy
 , a Napoleonic War brig-sloop class of the Royal Navy.
 , an 1850s sloop class of the Royal Navy.

See also
 
 Cruiser